The Foton factory in Bydgoszcz, Poland, was the first Polish producer, from 1926 to 2007, of photosensitive material on photographic paper.

History

Interwar period, "ALFA" company
Marian Dziatkiewicz (1890–1956) came from Witków near Gniezno. Educated as an engineer in Poznań, he bought in 1922, a factory of sweets and chocolate in Bygdoszcz, at 3 Garbary Street. He lived nearby at Kącik street. In the mid-1920s, he closed down the factory and founded there in 1926, one of Poland first firm of  photochemical articles, named "ALFA". In his endeavour, he was backed by Tadeusz Cyprian, a lawyer and amateur of photography.

ALFA produced photographic plates, films, papers and chemicals. The high quality of "Alfa" products brought the company recognition, among the fierce competition of foreign companies.

In the 1930s Marian received a government loan for the expansion of its factory: between 1933 and 1934 he had a new plant built at 13 Piekna street, which started operating circa 1938.
After this expansion, the panel of products increased together with their quality, which compared brands such as Kodak or  Agfa. In 1934, the factory produced the first lots of X-ray photographic films and X-ray papers, as well as "Kinopozytyw" batches for the Polish cinema industry.

Marian Dziatkiewicz was hardworking, ambitious and passionate. While increasing his production he actively popularized the art of photography, publishing advertising materials, guides, reference books, photography manuals and a magazine presenting new products. In particular, he published 120,000 copies of a free textbook realized by his mentor Tadeusz Cyprian.

At that time the firm had five machines producing photographic emulsion and manufactured annually  of photo papers,  of photographic plates and films. The Great Depression slightly affected the company, as it had no competitors in Poland. At the eve of WWII, the plant employed 300 people and was operating at full capacity. In this period, Marian Dziatkiewicz had a representative office in Lviv (then in Poland). He also bought plots near Radom with the intention of building there a facility.

German occupation
During German occupation the factory passed under Nazi rule and resumed production under the calling Fabrik Fotochemischer Erzeugnisse-"OPTA" ('Photochemical Products Factory-"Opta"'). 

At the outbreak of the conflict, German representatives from the company "Agfa" inspected the plants in Bydgoszcz and were by surprised the quality of the polish products.

Marian Dziatkiewicz then moved to Warsaw and spent the entire time of the war there.

Polish People's Republic (1947–1989)
In 1945, Dziatkiewicz regained his company back for a short time, as "ALFA", still located at 3 Garbary street, was soon nationalized and controlled by the state-owned enterprise "Film Polski". The engineer moved to Wrocław where he set up a firm producing a drug needed for stomach x-rays, but eventually this business was also grabbed by the government. Marian Dziatkiewicz died in 1956.

At the beginning of 1948 the company was renamed "FOTON". It was then employing 188 people in Bydgoszcz, most of them were previous personnel from pre-war "ALFA".

During this period the catalogue of products remained similar to pre-war times, including glass plates (e.g. "Omega", "Ultrapan"). It was still the only company in this industry in Poland: a second "FOTON" plant, based in Warsaw and heavily damaged by the war, was put back into operation in 1949.
Since then, both "FOTON" facilities, in Bydgoszcz and Warsaw, get specialized: the Warsaw plant produced photosensitive materials for films (transparent substrate), while the Bydgoszcz plant dealt with papers, plates and chemicals.

In the 1950s "FOTON" was still using wooden machines from the "ALFA" period. In the 1970s, the entire production was moved from Garbary to Piękna street. The last manufacturing device from pre-war "ALFA" stopped working in the early 1980s. 

The "Bydgoskie Zakłady Fotochemiczne" output increased fourfold between 1950 and 1965, reaching annually:
  of photo papers;
 900 tons of chemicals;
  of photo plates. 
Later, the production relied on an English technology, for which a license for industrial use was implemented in 1975.

In 1969, to fulfill the license requirements, the factory was taken over by the Ministry of Chemical Industry and a new production complex was built at 13 Piękna Street in Szwederowo district, Bydgoszcz. The building, although brand new, was equipped with old technology which dictated the lay out of the production line, where semi-finished materials had to flow down from above. This point explains the choice of the design for the edifice, similar to a skyscraper.

In the mid-1960s, the Warsaw plant ceased producing color photographic materials and its manufacturing moved to Bydgoszcz, where the development of colored paper (called "Fotoncolor") was improved. Furthermore, the company set up a laboratory in charge of processing materials for customers from all over Poland. 

"Bydgoskie Zakłady Fotochemiczne", together with the University of Technology in Wrocław (Phototechnical Department) successfully elaborated a native technology but its implementation was hampered by the lack of specialized machinery in Poland: at the time, this equipment could only be purchased from Western countries.

In 1970 the company set up a new and experimental plant within Bydgoszcz's premises. Its aim was to meet the future needs of the Polish photochemical industry in terms of emerging technologies, as well as designing the associated producing devices. In 1973, the facility was expanded: eventually its output increased fivefold. By the end of the 1970s, "Bydgoskie Zakłady Fotochemiczne" laboratories formulated two types of negative films, "Foton Negatyw NB01" and "Foton Negatyw NB04", which were put on Polish market in the 1980s. Additionally, the manufacture of specialized products started, such as items for electrocardiography or tapes for train event recorders. In 1976, the plant employed about 900 employees, mostly women.

"FOTON" facility in Bydgoszcz reached its peaked activity between 1960 and 1968. During this period, around 20% of its production was exported, mainly to India, Brazil and Turkey. In the 1970s, purchasing countries were located in the Middle East, North Africa and Central America. 
By and large, exports flourished till 1985:
 black and white photographic paper to Soviet Union, Sweden and the United States;
 color paper to Bulgaria;
 photographic film to Hungary, Yugoslavia and Ecuador.
At the end of the 1980s, a significant amount of the production (i.e. color photography paper and processing chemicals) was earmarked for the Soviet market.

Before the collapse of the USSR and the Polish People's Republic, Bydgoszcz's FOTON belonged to the  "Union of the organic Industry Enterprises "Organika" based in Warsaw.

Third Polish Republic (since 1989)
On 28 February 1992 the facility moved to the hands of the Polish State Treasury, as "FOTON SA". In 1997, Foma Bohemia, a photographic company base in Hradec Králové, Czech Republic, acquired the majority of the company's shares.

Following the fall of the Communism in the 1990s and the ensuing economic turmoils, the plant experienced difficulties due to the contraction of the analog photography market. Nonetheless, the production of specialized materials (medical imaging, speed recorders) continued.

When almost the entire market shifted to digital photography in the 21st century, "FOTON SA" could not adjust: on 1 January 2007, the company declared bankruptcy. A similar fate befell the FOTON facility in Warsaw.

The same year, the commercial activity of "FOTON SA" was taken over by a new firm, "FOTON-BIS Sp. z o.o.", with headquarters located at 13 Piękna street in Bydgoszcz.

The "Bydgoszcz Museum of Photography", established in 2004, keeps a large panel of "ALFA" and "FOTON" products, items and parapheralnia in its collections.

In April 2016 the museum organized a symposium on the occasion of the 90th anniversary of the set up of the company "ALFA".

In October 2018 an exhibition titled "Women of FOTON" has been organized by the "Bydgoszcz Museum of Photography".

Characteristics
Bydgoszcz "Foton" produces photographic papers with various emulsion sensitivities.
The plant is currently specialized in manufacturing:
 photographic paper (black and white or with various types and shades) for enlargements and contact copies, professional and registration documents;
 paper for color prints;
 diverse-purpose photographic plates;
 chemicals;
 photosensitive materials, photographic glass, darkroom filters and positive film materials.

Gallery

See also 

 Bydgoszcz
  Warszawskie Zakłady Fotochemiczne „Foton"

References

Bibliography

External links
  Bydgoskie Zakłady Fotochemiczne
  Bydgoszcz Museum of Photography

:Category:Bydgoszcz
Companies based in Bydgoszcz